The 64th NHK Cup, or as it is officially known the  was a professional shogi tournament organized by the Japan Shogi Association and sponsored by Japan's public broadcaster NHK. Play began on April 6, 2014, and ended on March 22, 2015. The 50-player single elimination tournament was won by Toshiyuki Moriuchi. All of the tournament games were shown on NHK-E. The  during the NHK-E broadcasts was female professional Ichiyo Shimizu.

Participants

Preliminary tournaments
A total of 128 shogi professionals competed in 18 preliminary tournaments to qualify for the main tournament. These tournaments were untelevised one-day tournaments held at the Tokyo Shogi Kaikan and Kansai Shogi Kaikan. Each tournament consisted of seven or eight players. The initial time control for each player was 20 minutes followed by a 30-second byōyomi.

The female professional seed was determined by a single-game playoff between Tomomi Kai 2-crown (Women's ōi and Kurashiki Tōka) and Manao Kagawa (Women's ōshō), which was won by Kagawa. Brackets from two of the preliminary tournaments are shown below.

Main tournament
The first time control for main tournament games was ten minutes per player. Once this was used up, a second time control of 10 one-minute periods of  began. Each player was given 30 seconds to make their move. If they did so, then no thinking time periods were used. If, however, they did not, a thinking time period began and they then had up to one minute (more specifically 59 seconds) to make a move before entering the next thinking time period. This process was repeated until a player had used all ten thinking time periods when the final byōyomi time control of 30 seconds per move began. Sente was determined prior to each game by piece toss.

The 50 players listed below qualified for the main tournament.

Notes:
 "No." represents the bracket position of the player in their respective block and "Rank/Title" represents the rank or titles held by the player when the original bracket finalized. A dan/ grading system is used for ranking players. The number in parenthesis after each player's name represents the number of times said player has appeared in the main tournament.
 Players whose names are in bold were seeded directly into the main tournament as follows:
 63rd NHK Cup (four players):  Gōda (champion), Maruyama (runner-up), Ōishi (semifinalist) and Nishikawa (semifinalist).
 Seven major titleholders (three players): Moriuchi (Meijin and Ryūō), Habu (ōza, ōi, and Kisei), Watanabe (Kiō and ōshō)    
 Class A (seven players): Miura, Yashiki, Y. Satō, Fukaura, Tanigawa, Namekata and Kubo 
 Class B1 (twelve players): Takahashi, Hashimoto, Yamasaki, Matsuo, Kimura, Hatakeyama, Hirose, Akutsu, Suzuki, Iizuka, Fujii and Toyoshima
 Other tournament winners (two players): Inaba (Ginga-sen), Sasaki (Kakogawa Seiryū-sen)
 Women's professional (one player): Kagawa (Women's ōshō) 
 Others with outstanding records (three players): Sugai (Class C1), Nagase (Class C2) and K. Abe (Class C2)
Among these 32 seeds, the following 14 were given byes in round 1 and began play in round 2: Gōda, Maruyama, Ōishi, Nishikawa, Moriuchi, Habu, Watanabe, Miura, Yashiki, Y. Satō, Fukaura, Tanigawa, Namekata and Kubo.
 The remaining players qualified by winning preliminary tournaments.

The bracket at the start of the tournament is shown below.

Results

Round 1
A total of 18 games were played in round 1. Play began on April 6, 2014, and ended on August 3, 2014. The 18 preliminary tournament winners were paired against 18 seeded players. Out of the four players who qualified for the main tournament for the first time, only Manabu Kumasaka was able to make it to the second round. Namekata and Sawada actually had to play two games before a winner was determined. The first game between the two lasted more than two hours before ending in impasse after 252 moves. A second game with sente-gote reversed was then played at a time control of 5 one-minute "thinking periods" followed by a byōyomi of 30 seconds per move and Namekata won in 88 moves.

Round 2
Round 2 began August 10 and lasted until November 23, 2014. A total of 16 games were played with 14 players receiving first round byes joining the nine winners from round 1. For the second year in a row multiple major titleholder Akira Watanabe loses in round 2. Also, for the second year in a row, Kōta Kanai beats Toshiaki Kubo in the round 2. Takeshi Fujii had to play two games against Yasumitsu Satō before a winner was determined. The first game between the two ended in sennichite after 70 moves. A second game with sente-gote reversed was then played with Fujii winning in 121 moves. Hisashi Namekata and Shingo Sawada also needed two games for a winner to be determined. The first game between the two ended in impasse after 252 moves, and Namekata won the replay with sente-gote reversed in 88 moves.

Round 3
Play began on November 30, 2014, and ended on January 25, 2015. Out of the 18 preliminary tournament winners, only Kanai 5d made it to round 3.

Quarterfinals
The eight remaining players were paired off against each other with play beginning on February 1 and ending on February 22, 2015. No major titleholders made it as far as the quarterfinals.

Semifinals
The two remaining players from each block with paired against each other to determine the respective block winners. The 1st semifinal game between Kōichi Fukaura 9d (sente) and Toshiyuki Moriuchi 9d (gote) was broadcast on March 1, 2015. Moriuchi won the game in 166 moves to win block B. The guest analyst was Yaumitsu Satō 9d. The 2nd semifinal game was between Hisashi Namekata 8d (sente) and Takanori Hashimoto 8d (gote). The game was broadcast on March 8, 2015, and won by Namekata 8d when Hashimoto 8d was disqualified for making an illegal move (Nifu) on his 92nd move. Namekata thus won block A and advanced to the finals of the tournament for the first time. The guest analyst for the 2nd semifinal game was Kazuki Kimura 8d. The host for both semifinal games was female professional Rieko Yauchi 5d.

Final
After 109 preliminary tournament games and 58 main tournament games involving 161 players, Toshiyuki Moriuchi 9d and Hisashi Namekata 9d met in the final broadcast on March 22, 2015. This was the first NHK Cup final appearance for Namekata and the fifth appearance for Moriuchi. The piece toss before the game resulted in Namekata being sente. Moriuchi won the game in 134 moves, thus winning the tournament for the third time and becoming the 64th NHK Cup Champion. The guest analyst for the final match were Takeshi Fujii 9d and the hosts of the final were NHK announcer  and female professional Ichiyo Shimizu.

The game score and a diagram showing the final position is given below.

Sente: Hisashi Namekata 8d
Gote: Toshiyuki Moriuchi 9d
Opening: Bishop Exchange
1. P-7f, 2. P-8d, 3. P-2f, 4. G-3b, 5. G-7h, 6. P-8e, 7. B-7g, 8. P-3d, 9. S-8h, 10. Bx7g+, 11. Sx7g, 12. S-4b, 13. S-3h, 14. S-7b, 15. P-9f, 16. P-9d, 17. P-4f, 18. P-6d, 19. S-4g, 20. S-6c, 21. K-6h, 22. S-5d, 23. S-5f, 24. P-4d, 25. G-5h, 26. G-5b, 27. P-3f, 28. K-4a, 29. P-1f, 30. P-1d, 31. K-7i, 32. K-3a, 33. N-3g, 34. P-7d, 35. P-6f, 36. S-3c, 37. R-4h, 38. G5b-4b, 39. K-8h, 40. K-2b, 41. G5h-6h, 42. G4b-4c, 43. P-9h, 44. P-3e, 45. Px3e, 46. S-2d, 47. P-4e, 48. Sx3e, 49. P*3f, 50. Sx3f, 51. Px4d, 52. G4c-4b, 53. B*4f, 54. R-9b, 55. P-1e, 56. Px1e, 57. P*1g, 58. B*5a, 59. R-1h, 60. Sx3g, 61. BX6f, 62. Sx2f, 63. G-5h, 64. Bx7g+, 65. Gx7g, 66. P*6c, 67. Bx9a+, 68. Rx9a, 69. L*2i, 70. B*4f, 71. Lx2f, 72. Bx1h+, 73. Lx1h, 74. R*2h, 75. S-6g, 76. Rx2f+, 77. Lx1e, 78. N*5e, 79. P-1b+, 80. Lx1b, 81. Sx5f, 82. Lx1e, 83. Sx5e, 84. Sx5e, 85. N*7d, 86. K-7c, 87. Nx6b+, 88. Gx6b, 89. B*8b, 90. Sx6f, 91. P*7f, 92. K-2b, 93. Bx9a+, 94. Sx7g+, 95. Nx7g, 96. S*6i, 97. S*3c, 98. Nx3c, 99. Px3c+, 100. Gx3c, 101. N*1d, 102. K-1c, 103. S*2b, 104. Kx1d, 105. G*1c, 106. K-2e, 107. R*6e, 108. L*3e, 109. Rx6i, 110. N*2d, 111. B*4g, 112. S*4f, 113. S*3g, 114. Nx7f, 115. K-7h, 116. Sx4g+, 117. Sx2f, 118. Kx2f, 119. R-2i, 120. N*2g, 121. R*6f, 122. P*4f, 123. Gx4g, 124. B*4e, 125. S*5f, 126. G*6h, 127. Rx6h, 128. Nx6h+, 129. Kx6h, 130. L*6f, 131. P*6g, 132. Px4g+, 133. Sx4e, 134. R*5h sente resigns (diagram)

The final tournament bracket is shown below.

Other 
 In addition to the defending champion Gōda, there were nine other former champions who qualified for the main tournament: Habu (38th, 41st, 45th, 47th—48th, 50th, 58th—61st), Y. Satō (56th—57th), Moriuchi (46th, 51st), Suzuki (49th), Miura (52nd), Kubo (53rd), Yamasaki (54th), Maruyama (55th), Watanabe (62nd). 
 Sente won 29 (a little under 60%) of the 49 games. 
 The average number of moves for the main tournament games was 120. The most moves played in a single game was 252 (Rd. 2, Namekata vs. Sawada) while the fewest moves played was 68 (Rd. 2, Miura vs. Toyoshima). 
 Namekata versus Sawada in round 2 ended in impasse and both players played a second game with sente-gote reversed to determine the final result. Satō versus Fujii in round 2 ended in sennichite after 70 moves. The game was replayed with Fujii being sente at adjusted time controls which Fujii won in 121 moves.
There was one disqualification due to an illegal move: Hashimoto 8d lost his semifinal game against Namekata 8d for the illegal move "Nifu" on his 92nd move. 
The age breakdown (age at start of the tournament) for the players who qualified was as follows: 10–19 years old, 2 players; 20–29 years old, 15 players; 30–39 years old, 11 players; 40–49 years old, 18 players; 50–59 years old, 4 players. The oldest player was Kōji Tosa 7d (59 years old) and the youngest player was Yūki Sasaki 4d (19 years old).

See also 
61st NHK Cup (shogi)
62nd NHK Cup (shogi)
63rd NHK Cup (shogi)

Notes

References 

Japanese games
Japanese television series
NHK original programming
NHK Cup (shogi)